Haselgebirge is a mylonite composed of mineral clay, sandstone, anhydrite, rock salt is and other salts. The structure of the Hallstatt evaporite body (Northern
5 Calcareous Alps, Austria): a compressive diapir
6 superposed by strike-slip shear?

Haselgebirge is common is Alps, where it is used for salt extraction by the sinkworks method.

References

Sedimentary rocks
Salt production